Lake Pressegg is a lake in Carinthia, Austria. It is located in a glacial valley within the Gailtal Alps, a mountain range of the Southern Limestone Alps, east of Hermagor. It is characterized by extended reed beds, while there are also bathing beaches on the northern and southern shore busy in summer.

References 

Lakes of Carinthia (state)